Filamin A interacting protein 1 like is a protein that in humans is encoded by the FILIP1L gene.

References

Further reading